Las Camelias Lake Wildlife Refuge, is a wildlife refuge that is part of the Arenal Huetar Norte Conservation Area, in the northern part of Costa Rica, near Upala in the Alajuela Province, close to the border with Nicaragua. It protects palustrine wetlands and forests which serve as a feeding and breeding ground for 240 species of birds, including the Muscovy duck and jabiru. It was created in 1994 by decree 22753-MIRENEM.

References

Geography of Alajuela Province
Nature reserves in Costa Rica
Protected areas established in 1994